Raná is a municipality and village in Chrudim District in the Pardubice Region of the Czech Republic. It has about 300 inhabitants.

Administrative parts
Villages of Medkovy Kopce and Oldřetice are administrative parts of Raná.

References

External links

Villages in Chrudim District